Uriel Avigdor Adriano Ruiz (born April 30, 1990) is a taekwondo practitioner from Mexico. Adriano won the gold medal in the men's lightweight (under 74 kg) division at the 2013 World Taekwondo Championships in Puebla.
 As a lightweight (under 74 kg), he won the bronze medal at the 2011 Pan American Games in the 80 kg event. He was born in Guadalajara.

References 

1990 births
Mexican male taekwondo practitioners
Living people
Taekwondo practitioners at the 2011 Pan American Games
Sportspeople from Guadalajara, Jalisco
Pan American Games bronze medalists for Mexico
Pan American Games medalists in taekwondo
World Taekwondo Championships medalists
Medalists at the 2011 Pan American Games
20th-century Mexican people
21st-century Mexican people